The Fuchsberg Jerusalem Center for Conservative Judaism is the central organization for Conservative Judaism in Israel. The Fuchsberg Center houses the Conservative Yeshiva, Moreshet Yisrael synagogue, and the Agron Guest House managed by the Israel Youth Hostel Association.

Founding
Founded in 1972 by the leaders of the United Synagogue to establish a center for Torah study, hospitality, and to be exposed to the Jerusalem/Israel Experience.

Yeshiva
The Conservative Yeshiva is a co-educational institute for study of traditional Jewish texts. The Yeshiva was founded in 1995 and is under the Academic Auspices of the Jewish Theological Seminary of America.

The current Roshei Yeshiva are Rabbi Joel Levy and Dr. Joshua Kulp.

The Yeshiva offers Jews from outside the Orthodox world the opportunity to gain the advanced Jewish learning and communal experiences provided by attending a Yeshiva.  The Yeshiva offers  a synthesis of traditional and critical methods, allowing Jewish texts and tradition to encounter social change and modern scholarship. The curriculum focuses on classical Jewish subjects, including Talmud, Tanakh, Midrash, Halacha, and philosophy. Learning is conducted in the traditional yeshiva method (shiur and chavruta) with an openness to modern scholarship.

The Conservative Yeshiva's educational programs include a one-year program, pre-college program, advanced studies program, summer program, and the  Nativ College Leadership Program in Israel Yeshiva Track.

See also
 Conservative Yeshiva
 United Synagogue of Conservative Judaism
 Nativ College Leadership Program in Israel
 Jewish Theological Seminary of America

External links

The Conservative Yeshiva Official Site

Conservative Judaism in Israel
Conservative yeshivas
Yeshivas in Israel